Valdez is a municipality of Sucre State, Venezuela. The capital is Güiria.

Localities
 

Mapire, Peninsula de Paria

Municipalities of Sucre (state)